Milad Mohammadi (born 29 September 1993) is an Iranian professional footballer who plays for Greek Super League club AEK Athens and the Iranian national team. Known for his speed and versatility, Milad plays as a left back and winger. His twin brother Mehrdad plays for Al-Arabi in the Qatar Stars League.

Club career

Rah Ahan
Milad Mohammadi joined Rah Ahan in the summer of 2014 with a five–year contract and made his debut for them in the first fixture of the 2014–15 Iran Pro League against Esteghlal.

In July 2015 Mohammadi went on trial with Austrian Bundesliga club Sturm Graz. He reportedly had two offers from European sides but Rah Ahan coach Farhad Kazemi refused to let him leave the club.

Akhmat Grozny
On 6 February 2016 Mohammadi signed a contract with Russian Premier League club Terek Grozny until 2019. Milad made his debut for Terek Grozny as a substitute on 2 April 2016 in a 3–2 win over Anzhi Makhachkala. Mohammadi scored his first goal for Terek and his first ever professional league goal on 29 April 2017 in a 5–2 victory against Ural Yekaterinburg. After the 2016–17 season, he was named as one of the top 50 U23 Asian talents to watch for. 

On 27 May 2019, Akhmat confirmed that Mohammadi left the club as a free agent upon the expiration of his contract.

Gent
In July 2019 Mohammadi signed with Belgian club Gent.

AEK Athens
On 17 September 2021, Mohammadi signed a three-year contract with Superleague Greece side AEK Athens after getting released from Gent on 25 August.

International career
Mohammadi scored a goal during the 2016 AFC U-23 Championship.

Carlos Queiroz invited Mohammadi to a national team camp in June 2015, making his debut against Uzbekistan in a friendly match on 11 June 2015 and was on the bench on 16 June 2015 in a World Cup qualifier against Turkmenistan.

He was named in Iran's squad for the 2018 FIFA World Cup in Russia, where he came to prominence when he tried and failed at an extravagant throw-in, in the 93rd minute while Iran were trailing 1–0 to Spain.

Career statistics

Club

International
Statistics accurate as of match played 29 November 2022

Personal life
Milad Mohammadi was born south of Tehran in Fallah district, however he has said that he is a native of Qazvin. His family is originally from Qazvin Province, Iran. Football fans in Iran nicknamed him "Mig-Mig" that refers to a cartoon character named Roadrunner in Wile E. Coyote and the Road Runner. He is the twin brother of Mehrdad Mohammadi.

References

External links

Milad Mohammadi at PersianLeague.com (archived)
Milad Mohammadi at IranLeague.ir (archived)

1993 births
Living people
People from Qazvin
Twin sportspeople
Iranian twins
Iranian footballers
Association football defenders
Association football wingers
Iran youth international footballers
Iran international footballers
Rah Ahan players
FC Akhmat Grozny players
K.A.A. Gent players
AEK Athens F.C. players
Persian Gulf Pro League players
Russian Premier League players
Belgian Pro League players
Super League Greece players
Iranian expatriate footballers
Expatriate footballers in Russia
Expatriate footballers in Belgium
Expatriate footballers in Greece
Iranian expatriate sportspeople in Russia
Iranian expatriate sportspeople in Belgium
Iranian expatriate sportspeople in Greece
2018 FIFA World Cup players
2019 AFC Asian Cup players
2022 FIFA World Cup players